The 2015–16 season was Académica de Coimbra's 64th season in the Primeira Liga and 14th and final consecutive season in the top flight of Portuguese football. Briosa also participated in the Taça de Portugal and Taça da Liga. The club was initially managed by José Viterbo in what would have been his first full season as manager. Viterbo, however, resigned on 20 September 2015 and later replaced by Filipe Gouveia on 24 September. The club were relegated from the top flight of Portuguese football for the first time since the 1998–99 season, following a home draw with Braga on 7 May 2016.

Competitions

Pre-season

Primeira Liga

League table

Results by round

Matches

Taça de Portugal

Third round

Fourth round

Fifth round

Taça da Liga

Second round

Players

Appearances and goals

|-
! colspan="14" style="background:#dcdcdc; text-align:center"| Goalkeepers

|-
! colspan="14" style="background:#dcdcdc; text-align:center"| Defenders

|-
! colspan="14" style="background:#dcdcdc; text-align:center"| Midfielders

|-
! colspan="14" style="background:#dcdcdc; text-align:center"| Forwards

|-

Transfers

Summer

In:

Out:

Winter

In:

Out:

Technical staff
{| class="wikitable"
|-
!Position
!Name
|-
| Head coach
| Filipe Gouveia
|-
| Assistant coach
| Miguel PintoSérgio CarvalhoJoão Veloso
|-
| Goalkeeping coach
| Ricardo Fonseca
|-

References

2015-16
Portuguese football clubs 2015–16 season